Kate A. Brauman is an American scientist who uses an interdisciplinary tool set to examine the interactions between land use change and water resources. Brauman is the lead scientist for the Global Water Initiative at University of Minnesota's Institute on the Environment.

Early life and education
Brauman, daughter of two chemists (John I. Brauman and Sharon K Brauman), grew up in the San Francisco Bay Area and had mixed feelings about being a scientist. She notes that it was her undergraduate mentor, Robert Pollack who helped her see the connections between her desire to be creative and affect things that people care about, with science. Brauman graduated Summa Cum Laude with a Bachelor of Arts in Science and Religion from Columbia University in 2000. After college she worked at the Natural Resources Defense Council from 2001 to 2004 where she was the Membership and Public Education Senior Associate. She credits her time at the NRDC for making her realize that the environment, in particular water and energy, are areas that people care deeply about; plus questions around water and energy need to be approached from multiple angles: biophysical, economic, and social, to find real-world solutions. After her time with the NRDC, she went on to get her Ph.D. at Stanford University, funded by the National Science Foundation's Graduate Research Fellowship and the Lucille Packard Stanford Graduate Fellowship, within the Emmett Interdisciplinary Program in Environment and Resources with an emphasis in hydrologic ecosystem services in 2010.  Brauman's interdisciplinary dissertation, under the direction of Gretchen Daily and David Freyberg, brought together elements of hydrology, ecohydrology, and economics to understand the impacts of water extraction on the Big Island of Hawai'i.

Career and research
Currently, Brauman is the Lead Scientist of the Global Water Assessment under the Institute on the Environment at the University of Minnesota.  Brauman's research incorporates economics and policy into her examination of the availability of water resources. Much of her work examines how human changes to our landscape, in particular through the growing of food, affect the quality and quantity of our water resources. Brauman's interest in understanding and valuing the ecosystem services of landscapes runs through much of her work - whether it be provisioning drinking water, irrigation water, carbon sequestration, or food security. Her research, at the intersection of society and science, provides critical information to resource managers (e.g. agricultural producers) that can improve water use efficiency.

Brauman also works collaboratively with multiple international groups examining ecosystem services globally. She is part of the Intergovernmental Science-Policy Platform on Biodiversity and Ecosystem Services (IPBES), a group advocating for recognition of the value of nature to human populations.

Notable publications
Brauman's work, published in a variety of peer-reviewed journals (e.g. Nature, Science, Proceedings of the National Academy Sciences, Environmental Research Letters, Water Resources Research) is highly cited. A few of her most highly cited works are listed below:

Solutions for a cultivated planet, Nature, 2011
The Nature and Value of Ecosystem Services: an overview highlights hydrologic services, Annual Review of Environment and Resources, 2007
Improvements in rop water productivity increase water sustainability and food security - a global analysis, Environmental Research Letters, 2013

Awards and recognition

2018-2019 Fellow for the Leshner Leadership Institute for Public Engagement with Science, run by the American Association for the Advancement of Science's (AAAS) Center for Public Engagement with Science and Technology.
2015, Policy Fellow, Center for the Study of Politics and Government, University of Minnesota
2014, Future Earth Fellow, Future Earth Young Scientists Networking Conference on Ecosystems and Human Well being in the green economy
2012, Planet Under Pressure, Best Early Career Researcher Poster. Water Wise: Are we getting enough crop per drop?

References

Living people
Year of birth missing (living people)
Place of birth missing (living people)
Scientists from the San Francisco Bay Area
Columbia College (New York) alumni
Stanford University alumni
Natural Resources Defense Council people
University of Minnesota faculty
American ecologists
Women ecologists